Martin & Vleminckx is a roller coaster manufacturing and construction company headquartered in Montreal, Quebec, Canada with an affiliated office and manufacturing facility in Haines City, Florida, United States, and two subsidiaries, including a warehouse, in China.

History
Martin & Vleminckx was founded in 1984 by Ghislain Martin and Alain Vleminckx. The company has since expanded to feature a team of 50 staff.

Martin & Vleminckx supplied the first wooden roller coaster to China in 2009. Martin & Vleminckx worked alongside government officials to develop regulations for Chinese wooden roller coasters, before Wooden Coaster - Fireball at Happy Valley Shanghai could be approved to open. In the past decade, Martin & Vleminckx has become the primary wooden roller coaster supplier in China.

Projects
Martin & Vleminckx has erected roller coasters and other amusement rides manufactured by a variety of companies from around the world. Including: Bolliger & Mabillard, Chance Morgan, Hopkins Rides, Intamin, Maurer AG, ProSlide Technology, Vekoma, Zamperla,  Martin & Vleminckx installed the two tallest roller coasters in the world; Kingda Ka in New Jersey, and Top Thrill Dragster in Ohio. All roller coasters manufactured by Martin & Vleminckx were designed by The Gravity Group.

Manufacturing
 Coastersaurus at Legoland Florida
 Boardwalk Bullet at Kemah Boardwalk
 Wooden Coaster - Fireball at Happy Valley Shanghai
 Zippin Pippin at Bay Beach Amusement Park
 Dauling Dragon at Happy Valley Wuhan
 Fjord Flying Dragon at Happy Valley Tianjin
 Time Traveler at Hot Go Park
 Jungle Trailblazer at Oriental Heritage Jinan
 Jungle Trailblazer at Fantawild Dreamland Zhengzhou
 Jungle Trailblazer at Oriental Heritage Wuhu
 Jungle Trailblazer at Oriental Heritage Ningbo
 Jungle Trailblazer at Fantawild Dreamland Zhuzhou
 Jungle Trailblazer at Oriental Heritage Xiamen
 Jungle Trailblazer at Fantawild Asian Legend Nanning
Thunder Eagle at Race World in Pigeon Forge, TN
Thunder Coaster at Tusenfryd in Oslo, Norway
Robin Hood at Walibi Holland in Biddinghuizen
Comet at Great Escape in Lake George, NY
Arkansas Twister at Magic Springs in Hot Springs, AR
LeMonstre at Six Flags LaRonde in Montreal
Twisted Sisters at Kentucky Kingdom in Louisville, KY

Rebuild
 Zippin Pippin at Bay Beach Amusement Park – a reconstruction of the Libertyland wooden roller coaster, with The Gravity Group consulting on engineering

Retrack
Martin & Vleminckx has retracked 19 coasters
 Arkansas Twister at Magic Springs and Crystal Falls
 Big Dipper at Geauga Lake
 Blue Streak at Cedar Point
 Cheetah at Wild Adventures
 Excalibur at Funtown Splashtown USA
 GhostRider at Knott's Berry Farm
 Great White at Morey's Piers
 Hercules at Dorney Park & Wildwater Kingdom
 Le Monstre at La Ronde
 Mean Streak at Cedar Point
 Raging Wolf Bobs at Geauga Lake
 Shivering Timbers at Michigan's Adventure
 Thunder Run at Kentucky Kingdom
 Villain at Geauga Lake
 Boulder Dash at Lake Compounce
 Wildcat at Lake Compounce
 Wild One at Six Flags America
 Wolverine Wildcat at Michigan's Adventure
 Yankee Cannonball at Canobie Lake Park

Roller coaster construction
 Arkansas Twister at Magic Springs and Crystal Falls
 Batman: The Dark Knight at Six Flags New England
 Boomerangs at Elitch Gardens Theme Park, Jerudong Park, Kentucky Kingdom, La Ronde, Montjuïc, Parque de la Costa, Six Flags Fiesta Texas, Six Flags Mexico, Six Flags New Orleans, Visionland, and Wild Adventures
 Chang at Kentucky Kingdom
 Comet at Crystal Beach Park and Great Escape
 Dragon at Legoland Florida
 Flying Coaster at Elitch Gardens Theme Park
 Flying School at Legoland Florida
 Goliath at La Ronde
 Kingda Ka at Six Flags Great Adventure
 Le Monstre at La Ronde
 Le Vampire at La Ronde
 Roller Skater at Kentucky Kingdom
 Super Manège at La Ronde
 Suspended Looping Coasters at Elitch Gardens Theme Park, Hunt's Pier, Kentucky Kingdom, Magic Springs and Crystal Falls, Opryland, Parque de la Costa, Six Flags America, Six Flags New England, and Wild Adventures
 Thundercoaster at Tusenfryd
 Thunder Eagle at Belle Island Village
 Top Thrill Dragster at Cedar Point
 Twisted Twins at Kentucky Kingdom
 X-Coaster at Magic Springs and Crystal Falls

Amusement ride construction
 Bugs' White Water Rapids at Six Flags Fiesta Texas
 Drop Tower: Scream Zone at California's Great America
 Giant Wheel at Kentucky Kingdom
 Grand Carousel at La Ronde
 Grande Roue at La Ronde
 Manitou at La Ronde
 Menhir Express at Parc Astérix
 Mile High Falls at Kentucky Kingdom
 Navy Pier Ferris Wheel at Navy Pier
 Splash at La Ronde
 Superman: Tower of Power at Kentucky Kingdom
 Tour de ville at La Ronde
 Tower of Doom at Elitch Gardens Theme Park
 Vertigo at La Ronde

List of roller coasters

As of 2019, Martin & Vleminckx has built 16 roller coasters around the world.

References

External links
 
 

Construction and civil engineering companies of the United States
Manufacturing companies based in Florida
Manufacturing companies based in Montreal
Roller coaster manufacturers